The Taruheru River is a river of the Gisborne Region of New Zealand's North Island. It flows predominantly southeast from sources close to the settlement of Ormond before flowing through the city of Gisborne. Here it meets the waters of the Waimata River, and the combined waters flow to the northern end of Poverty Bay as the Turanganui River.

See also
List of rivers of New Zealand

References

Rivers of the Gisborne District
Rivers of New Zealand